Rebecca Jane Lacey (born 20 April 1965) is an English actress.

Early life
She was born in Watford, Hertfordshire, England, the daughter of actor Ronald Lacey and actress Mela White.

Career
Lacey is best known for her roles as Irene Stuart (series 4) in Monarch of the Glen, the feisty Dr. George Woodman in Casualty (having previously made two guest appearances in the series as patients in 1991 and 1994), and ditzy but kind-hearted Hilary in May to December. She has also played a number of roles in The Bill and many other TV series.

In 1992 she appeared in the film Carry On Columbus and followed it up in 1996 with an appearance in the BBC/WGBH comedy Heavy Weather written by P.G. Wodehouse and starring Peter O'Toole. She has appeared in a number of theatre productions including a season with Alan Ayckbourn in Terry Johnson's Dead Funny in the West End and Amy's View by David Hare.

Personal life
Lacey and her husband Paul Harrison have a son, Charlie, born in November 2002, and a daughter, Betsy May, born in November 2005. She has also appeared supporting the One campaign founded by actress Claire Goose's brother Duncan, selling bottled water in order to fund projects to provide clean drinking water around the world particularly in Africa. The campaign advert featured Lacey, Claire Goose, David Tennant, Hugo Speer and Ian Kelsey. She has also provided a number of TV advertising voiceovers.

Television filmography
 Grantchester 2022 (S7 E2) - Betty Rose 
 Doc Martin 2017 (S8 E4) - Tara Newcross
 Rellik 2017 Gabriel's therapist 
 Endeavour 2017 S4 E2 Canticle
 New Tricks 2015 ("The Wolf of Wallbrook") - Cindy
 Doctors 2013 4eps Laura Tyler 2010 1ep Ella Mackie
 The Bill 2007 (episode 475) - Shiela Morgan
 Hustle 2005 ("Confessions") -  Juliette Keyes
 Heartbeat 2005 ("Blast From The Past") - Louise Parry
 M.I.T.: Murder Investigation Team 2005 (series 2 episode 3) - Ruth Baxter
 Murder in Suburbia 2004 ("Millionaire's Row") - Hannah Finch
 Monarch of the Glen 2004 (Series 4 eps 1-8) - Irene
 Murder in Mind 2002 ("Memories") - Jenny Wilsher
 Badger 1999 (various episodes) - RSPB Officer Claire Armitage
 Casualty 1997-99 (various episodes) - Dr Georgina 'George' Woodman
 The Bill 1997 ("Once Bitten") - Diane Holloway
 A Touch of Frost 1996 ("Fun Times for Swingers") - Anne-Marie Pearce
 Game On ("Bad Timing") 1995 - Claudia
 Comedy Firsts 1995 (The Smiths) - Carol Smith
 The Darling Buds of May 1993 (2 episodes) - Marion Winters
 May to December 1989–93 (Series 1-5) - Hilary
 Hannay 1989 ("The Confidence Man") - Florence Peterson
 The Bill 1989 ("Street Games and Board Games") - Debbie
 News at Twelve 1988 (various episodes) - Sharon Doyle
 The Bretts 1987 (various episodes) - Emily
 Home to Roost 1986–89 (3 episodes) - Julie Willows
 Lovejoy 1986 ("To Sleep No More") - Receptionist
 Starting Out 1986 (To Be or Not to Be) - Maggie Robertson
 Mann's Best Friends (1985) - Receptionist
 Shine on Harvey Moon 1984 ("Fools Rush In") - Gloria Pelham
 The Bill 1984 ("It's Not Such a Bad Job After All") - video shop assistant

Filmography
 Chalet Girl  2011 - Thea Matthews
 Arthur's Dyke 2001 - Phillipa
 Heavy Weather BBC, 1995 - Sue Brown
 Carry On Columbus 1992 - Chiquita

Other work
Narrator - Anne Of Austria 1998 (Chivers Audio Books)
Narrator - The Exorcist (BBC Everyman)
Numerous TV adverts (O2, McVities, Tropicana, Oral B, The Sunday Times, Canon, KLM)

Plays
Mistress Page - The Merry Wives Of Windsor (2018) (Royal Shakespeare company)
Margaret Hyman - Broken glass (2018) (Watford Palace)
Mrs Bennett - Pride and Prejudice (2013) (Regent's Park Open Air Theatre)
Patricia - Merit (2015) (Royal Theatre, Plymouth)
Sheila - Benefactors (2012) (Sheffield Theatres)
Elmire - Tartuffe (2011) (English Touring Theatre)
Siobhan - The Curious Incident of the Dog in the Nighttime'' (2015) (Gielgud Theatre, London)

References

1965 births
English television actresses
Living people
Actors from Watford
Actresses from Hertfordshire
English people of Australian descent